Derek Richard John Cox (1931–2008) was a male athlete who competed for England.

Athletics career
He represented England in the shot put, long jump and high jump at the 1954 British Empire and Commonwealth Games in Vancouver, Canada.

References

1931 births
2008 deaths
English male shot putters
Athletes (track and field) at the 1954 British Empire and Commonwealth Games
English male long jumpers
English male high jumpers
Commonwealth Games competitors for England